Assyrian Jews (first appeared in the territory of Assyria when the Israelites were exiled to Assyria in approximately 740 BCE. Jews have been continuously living along side the Assyrian people in the territories of Assyria since the Assyrian exile. Assyrian Jews are Assyrian-speaking Mizrahi Jewish communities native to the geographic region of Mesopotamia, roughly covering parts of northwestern Iran, northern Iraq, northeastern Syria and southeastern Turkey. Assyrian Jews lived as closed ethnic communities until they were expelled from Arab and Muslim states from the 1940s–1950s onward. The community largely speaks Judeo-Aramaic. Many Assyrian Jews, especially the ones who hail from Iraq, went through a Sephardic Jewish blending during the 18th century.

See also
 Assyrian captivity
 Ktav Ashuri
 Ktav Ivri
 Adiabene
 Helena of Adiabene
 Jewish Babylonian Aramaic
 Jewish Palestinian Aramaic
 Judeo-Aramaic languages
 Aramaic studies

References

Works cited

External links

 Assyrian Jews
 Prof. Maoz about Assyrian Jews
 Assyrian Jews in Israel
 Assyrian Jews in Captivity
 Assyrian Jewish language

Mizrahi Jews
Ten Lost Tribes
Kingdom of Israel (Samaria)
Jews